Paul Karo (born ) is a New Zealand-born Australian former actor of Moroccan Jewish descent, best known for his role in telefilms and TV series including as Lee Whiteman in the 1970s television soap opera The Box. In 1967 he received the Best Actor for 1966 award (the "Erik") from Melbourne theatre critics for his role in A Lily for Little India. In 1976 he won the Best Australian Actor category at the Logie Awards.

Other TV credits include: Homicide, Division 4, Matlock Police, Prisoner, The Sullivans, Special Squad, Phoenix and SeaChange. An early television role was in Quiet Night in 1961.

Filmography

References

External links
 

Australian male television actors
Australian people of Moroccan-Jewish descent
Jewish Australian male actors
Living people
Logie Award winners
Australian Sephardi Jews
Year of birth missing (living people)